The Dickinson State Blue Hawks program is a college football team that represents Dickinson State University in the Dakota Athletic Conference, a part of the NAIA.  The team has had 15 head coaches since its first recorded football game in 1925. The former coach is Hank Biesiot who first took the position for the 1976 season. The current coach is Pete Stanton. Stanton was an assistant for 14 years with Biesiot.

Key

Coaches

Notes

References

Lists of college football head coaches

North Dakota sports-related lists